Eudioctria is a genus of robber flies in the family Asilidae. There are about 14 described species in Eudioctria.

Species
These 14 species belong to the genus Eudioctria:

References

Further reading

External links

 
 
 

Asilidae genera